Fatou N'Diaye is an actress, originally from Senegal, born 1980 in Saint-Louis du Sénégal.

Biography
At 8 years old, she left Senegal with her mother, and moved to Paris.

In 1997, aged 16/17, she was discovered by Oliviero Toscani, commercial photographer for the Benetton brand, which, subsequently, led to modelling assignments.

Fatou learned Guinea-Bissau Creole for her leading role as Vita in the 2002 film Nha fala.

Filmography 
 2001: Fatou la Malienne TV film by Daniel Vigne: Fatou
 2002: Asterix & Obelix: Mission Cleopatra by Alain Chabat: Exlibris
 2002: Angelina (TV): Angelina
 2002: Nha fala (My Voice) by Flora Gomes: Vita
 2003: Spirit of the Mask (TV series episode Aventure et associés): Celia
 2003: Fatou, l'espoir (TV): Fatou
 2004: Une autre vie (TV): Djenaba
 2004: Souli: Abi
 2006: Un dimanche à Kigali by Robert Favreau: Gentille
 2006: Guet-apens (TV series episode Alex Santana, négociateur): Julia
 2006 - Tropique amers
 2006: The Front Line by David Gleeson: Kala
 2007: Tropiques amers (TV series): Adèle
 2008: Aide-toi, le ciel t'aidera by François Dupeyron: Liz
 2008: Marianne (TV) by Philippe Guez from the series Scénarios contre les discriminations: Marianne
 2010: Victor Sauvage (TV) by Patrick Grandperret
 2010: Merci papa, merci maman (TV) by Vincent Giovanni: Audrey
 2011: Passage du désir (TV) by Jérôme Foulon: Ingrid Diesel
 2014: Engrenages (TV): Carole Mendy
 2018: Angel
 2019: Scappo a casa
 2021: OSS 117: Alerte Rouge en Afrique Noire

References

External links 

 

1980 births
Living people
French film actresses
French television actresses
Senegalese film actresses
Senegalese television actresses
Senegalese emigrants to France